Robert Eugene Richards (February 20, 1926 – February 26, 2023) was an American athlete, minister, and politician. He made three U.S. Olympic Teams in two events: the 1948, 1952, and 1956 Summer Olympics as a pole vaulter and as a decathlete in 1956. He won gold medals in pole vault in both 1952 and 1956, becoming the only male two-time champion in the event in Olympic history.

While still an active athlete, Richards became an ordained minister. He ran for President of the United States in 1984 on the Populist Party ticket.

While Richards is known for his extraordinary athleticism, that led to his appearing for many years on “Wheaties” cereal boxes and as a result, he became the “face” of that cereal for many years, particularly during the 1960s. Such recognition is rarely seen during this millennium.

Athletic career
Richards was the second man to pole vault 15 ft (4.57 m). While a student at the University of Illinois, Richards tied for the national collegiate pole vault title and followed that with 20 national Amateur Athletic Union (AAU) titles, including 17 in the pole vault and three in the decathlon. While Richards was the dominant vaulter of his time, he never set a world record.

Richards later became involved in promoting physical fitness and continued to vault in his later years. He was the first athlete to appear on the front of Wheaties cereal boxes in 1958 (though not the first depicted on all parts of the packaging), and also was the first Wheaties spokesman, setting up the Wheaties Sports Federation, which encouraged participation in Olympic sports. Richards had four sons who were also pole vaulters: Brandon, held the national high school record at 18'2" for fourteen years from 1985; Tom won the CIF California State Meet in 1988; and  Bob Jr. was second in the same meet in 1968 and later in 1973 ranked #7 in the United States.

Richards is the only male two-time Olympic gold medal winner in the pole vault (1952 and 1956), thus he is also the only man to have successfully defended his Olympic title.  He also won a bronze medal in the pole vault at the 1948 summer games. Russian Yelena Isinbayeva is the only other pole vaulter besides Richards to have won three Olympic medals in the pole vault, which she completed in 2012. Richards placed 13th in the decathlon at the 1956 Olympics.

Richards was elected to the U.S. Olympic Hall of Fame in 1983 and the United States National Track and Field Hall of Fame in 1975. As he aged, Richards continued participating in track and field in a variety of events, particularly throwing events.  He was one of the first regular participants in the origins of what now has become Masters athletics. 
Richards appeared on the panel game show What's My Line? episode #346 January 20, 1957.

Ministry

Richards was ordained in 1946 as a minister in the Church of the Brethren (which led to his being nicknamed the "Vaulting Vicar" or the "Pole Vaulting Parson"). As future tennis player Billie Jean King's church minister, Richards inspired King. One day, when King was 13 or 14, Richards asked her, "What are you going to do with your life?" She said: "Reverend, I'm going to be the best tennis player in the world." In 1957 the actor Hal Stalmaster played Richards as a teenager in an episode of the ABC anthology series Cavalcade of America.

Political career
In the 1984 United States presidential election, Richards ran for President of the United States on the far-right, white nationalist Populist Party ticket. He and running mate Maureen Salaman earned 66,324 votes.

Death
Richards died on February 26, 2023, a few days after his 97th birthday.

Awards 
Richards was inducted as a Laureate of The Lincoln Academy of Illinois and awarded the Order of Lincoln (the State's highest honor) by the Governor of Illinois in 2000 in the area of Sports. Richards is referenced in the ESPN 30 for 30 documentary "Survive and Advance", for the impact he had on former N.C. State coach Jim Valvano. Valvano cites hearing Richards speak when he was a teen and the motivational messages he implored. Richards was inducted into the National Fitness Hall of Fame in 2009 and was inducted into the Texas Track and Field Coaches Association Hall of Fame (Class of 2017).

See also
List of athletes on Wheaties boxes

References

External links

 
 
 
 

1926 births
2023 deaths
20th-century American politicians
20th-century far-right politicians in the United States
American male pole vaulters
American members of the Church of the Brethren
American Freedom Party politicians
Athletes (track and field) at the 1948 Summer Olympics
Athletes (track and field) at the 1951 Pan American Games
Athletes (track and field) at the 1952 Summer Olympics
Athletes (track and field) at the 1955 Pan American Games
Athletes (track and field) at the 1956 Summer Olympics
Church of the Brethren clergy
Illinois Fighting Illini men's track and field athletes
James E. Sullivan Award recipients
American masters athletes
Medalists at the 1956 Summer Olympics
Medalists at the 1952 Summer Olympics
Medalists at the 1948 Summer Olympics
Olympic bronze medalists for the United States in track and field
Olympic gold medalists for the United States in track and field
Pan American Games gold medalists for the United States
Pan American Games silver medalists for the United States
People from Palo Pinto County, Texas
Populist Party (United States, 1984) politicians
Sportspeople from Champaign, Illinois
Track and field athletes from Illinois
Candidates in the 1984 United States presidential election
Pan American Games medalists in athletics (track and field)
American white supremacists
Medalists at the 1951 Pan American Games
Medalists at the 1955 Pan American Games